Mark Jacobs is a former foreign service officer. He has published more than 90 stories in a range of magazines, including The Atlantic, The Iowa Review, The Kenyon Review, The Southern Review, The Idaho Review, and Southern Humanities Review. His story "How Birds Communicate" won the Iowa Review Fiction Prize in 1998. His five books include three novels and two collections of short stories. Pulitzer Prize winner in fiction Robert Olen Butler wrote that "Mark Jacobs is one of the most exciting new writers I've read in years... a writer who I think will become our own Graham Greene." While much of his earlier work was set in the countries in which he lived and traveled, more recent material has included novels and short stories that are set in the United States.

Jacobs lives with his wife Anne Bulen at Heron Hill in rural Virginia.

Short stories
"Heat," Shenandoah 
"Weightlifting for Catholics," The Atlantic
"Tell Us Where the Cows Are," Blue Moon Literary and Art Review 
"Notes Toward A Revised Definition of Myself" Chagrin River Review 
"This Year's Parade"  Literary Juice 
"The Widow Kip" The Adirondack Review 
"Stone Song" SN Review 
"Eat the Shark," Idaho Review 
"Snow Beers," The Kenyon Review 
"'Long About August," Indiana Review 
"My Support for Henry," Literary Juice 
"Reading the Cup," Border Crossing 
"Sturgeon", The Bacon Review  
Kiss," Literary Juice 
"Crux," Sawmill 
"The Old Mexican Consulate," South Dakota Review 
"Last Word," The Idaho Review 
"The Castle Stands," Reconfigurations 
"Loss Leader," Southern Humanities Review 
"Accidental Sighting," Southern Humanities Review 
"An Absence of Snow," Idaho Review 
"The Emperor's Cat," Reconfigurations 
"Singing in a Foreign Land," Reconfigurations 
"My Letter to Sandy," Reconfigurations 
"Dog in the Hole," Idaho Review 
"Tools," Licking River Review 
"Perfect Rush," The Southwest Review 
"How Birds Communicate," The Iowa Review 
"The Jesus Bear," Reconfigurations 
"Dog Love & Beyond," Louisiana Literature 
"Spring Cleaning," Webster Review 
"The Ballad of Tony Nail," Crucible 
"Deer," Crucible 
"Old Sneakers and the Idea of No," Pig Iron 
"Love in the Gash," Pikeville Review 
"The Question," Pig Iron 
"Stone Cowboy on the High Plains," Atlantic Monthly  
"The Significance of Doing," Farmer's Market 
"Down in Paraguay," Buffalo Spree Magazine 
"Sixto in Harvest," Farmer's Market 
"The Senator's Left Eye,"Crucible 
"Act of Contrition," Buffalo Spree Magazine 
"The Necessary Plane," The Sun 
"The Albino Pheasant,"Kiosk 
"Eusebio's Spaniard," Buffalo Spree 
"Little Bird's Indian," Farmer's Market 
"The Murder of German Morales," Nebraska Review 
"A Father's Tale," Buffalo Spree 
"The Agent," Webster Review 
"Susy's Lucy and the Big Dream Parrot," International Quarterly 
"Lover's Leap," North Dakota Quarterly 
"101 on the Edge," Buffalo Spree Magazine 
"How the World Began, For Real, "Kiosk 
"The Spam Letters," Owen Wister Review 
"Endchase," Buffalo Spree 
"Perfect Crime," Buffalo Spree 
"Morality Play," The Journal 
"Planting the Flag," New Delta Review 
"Solidarity in Green," The Southern Review 
"Fool's Progress," Red Cedar Review  
"Me, the Horseman,"Kiosk 
"The Egg Queen Rises," Buffalo Spree; anthologized in Living on the Edge, an anthology published by Curbstone Press, 1999 
"The Rape of Reason," North Dakota Quarterly 
"Heart,"  Nebraska Review
"The Lifestyle Implants Caper," Beloit Fiction Review 
"Mengele Dies Again," The American Literary Review 
"Amelia Questing," The Belletrist Review 
"Virtually Yours," The Southwest Review 
"The Way Grass Can Smell," New Delta Review 
"Consular Affair," New Letters 
"You and Me and the New Me," North Dakota Quarterly 
"After the War Was Over," The Southern Review 
"Dove of the Back Streets," Kenyon Review 
"Malaria," The Southern Review 
"Looking for Lourdes," The American Literary Review 
"Confidence in Izmir," The Southwest Review 
"Two Dead Indians," Kiosk 
"The Liberation of Little Heaven," The American Literary Review 
"Uncle Joe's Old Time Communist Nostalgia Bar," The Southern Review 
"In the City of X," The Southern Review 
"The Real Reason I Went to Nicaragua," The Nebraska Review 
"Mysterious Way," North Dakota Quarterly 
"Cholera," Crab Orchard Review 
"The Acrobat's Wife," The American Literary Review 
"In Vienna, In Glass," The Southern Review 
"Meat Eater," Green Mountains Review 
"White Cloud," The Southern Review 
"The Woman Who Couldn't Sleep," The Nebraska Review 
"Spanish Summer," North Dakota Quarterly 
"Thirsty Deer," South West Review 
"Shooting to Kill," American Literary Review 
"Witness Protection," Southern Review 
"Churoquella," Green Hills Literary Lantern

Essays
"Border Bleed" Peace Corps Worldwide 
"What Creeley Knew," Talisman
"Redrawing the Line: Gertrude Himmelfarb's On Looking into the Abyss" (an essay), International Quarterly
"Think of It as a Blackbird," Foreign Service Journal
Writers on America "Both Sides of the Border"; republished in World View Magazine
"Writing American," in Peace Corps Writers

Interviews
Ras 3:17 "The Professional" 
"Talking With Mark Jacobs," Peace Corps Writers 
"A Serious Conversation,"  Counterpunch

Awards
1998 Iowa Review Fiction Award for "How Birds Communicate"
1998 Crucible Prize for Fiction for "Deer"
1997 Crucible Prize for Fiction for "The Ballad of Tony Nail"
1994 Eyster Prize for Prose for "Planting the Flag"

References

1951 births
Living people
People from Niagara Falls, New York
Alma College alumni
SIT Graduate Institute alumni